Mathieu Quoidbach (21 September 1873 – 11 October 1951) was a Belgian racing cyclist. He won the Belgian national road race title in 1900.

References

External links
 

1873 births
1951 deaths
Belgian male cyclists
People from Verviers
Walloon sportspeople
Cyclists from Liège Province